The Idaho Freedom Caucus (IDFC) is part of the State Freedom Caucus Network and was officially launched in January of 2023. "Building on the success of the House Freedom Caucus (HFC), the SFCN will help establish State Freedom Caucuses (SFC) and provide the high-level staff, strategy, and community conservatives need to take ground across the country."

The caucus co-chairs of the Idaho Freedom Caucus for the 67th legislative session are Senator Tammy Nichols and Representative Heather Scott.

Membership
Membership is by invitation only. Members must fully support the mission and have a demonstrated commitment to conservative liberty-centered values.

See also
 State Freedom Caucus Network
 House Freedom Caucus

References

External links
 Twitter page
 Facebook page

Idaho Republicans
Idaho Legislature
Republican Party (United States) organizations